The Spanish missions in California formed a series of 21 religious outposts or missions established between 1769 and 1833 in what is now the U.S. state of California. The missions were established by Catholic priests of the Franciscan order to evangelize indigenous peoples backed by the military force of the Spanish Empire. The missions were part of the expansion and settlement of New Spain through the formation of Alta California, expanding the empire into the most northern and western parts of Spanish North America. Civilian settlers and soldiers accompanied missionaries and formed settlements like the Pueblo de Los Ángeles.

Indigenous peoples were forced into settlements called reductions, disrupting their traditional way of life and negatively affecting as many as one thousand villages. European diseases spread in the close quarters of the missions, causing mass death. Abuse, malnourishment, and overworking were common. At least 87,787 baptisms and 63,789 deaths occurred. Indigenous peoples often resisted and rejected conversion to Christianity. Some fled the missions while others formed rebellions. Missionaries recorded frustrations with getting indigenous people to internalize Catholic scripture and practice. Indigenous girls were taken away from their parents and housed at monjeríos. The missions' role in destroying Indigenous culture has been described as cultural genocide. 

By 1810, Spain's king had been imprisoned by the French, and financing for military payroll and missions in California ceased. In 1821, Mexico achieved independence from Spain, yet did not send a governor to California until 1824. The missions maintained authority over indigenous peoples and land holdings until the 1830s. At the peak of their influence in 1832, the coastal mission system controlled approximately one-sixth of Alta California. The First Mexican Republic secularized the missions with the Mexican secularization act of 1833, which emancipated indigenous peoples from the missions. Mission lands were largely given to settlers and soldiers, along with a minority of indigenous people.

The surviving mission buildings are the state of California's oldest structures and most-visited historic monuments, many of which were restored after falling into near disrepair in the early 20th century.They have become a symbol of California, appearing in many movies and television shows, and are an inspiration for Mission Revival architecture. Concerns have been raised by historians and Indigenous peoples of California about the way the mission period in California is taught in educational institutions and memorialized. The oldest European settlements of California were formed around or near Spanish missions, including the four largest: Los Angeles, San Diego, San Jose, and San Francisco.

Alta California mission planning, structure and culture

Coastal mission chain, planning and overview 

Prior to 1754, grants of mission lands were made directly by the Spanish Crown. But, given the remote locations and the inherent difficulties in communicating with the territorial governments, power was transferred to the viceroys of New Spain to grant lands and establish missions in North America. Plans for the Alta California missions were laid out under the reign of King Charles III, and came at least in part as a response to recent sightings of Russian fur traders along the California coast in the mid 1700s. The missions were to be interconnected by an overland route which later became known as the Camino Real. The detailed planning and direction of the missions was to be carried out by Friar Junípero Serra, O.F.M. (who, in 1767, along with his fellow priests, had taken control over a group of missions in Baja California Peninsula previously administered by the Jesuits).

The Rev. Fermín Francisco de Lasuén took up Serra's work and established nine more mission sites, from 1786 through 1798; others established the last three compounds, along with at least five asistencias (mission assistance outposts).

Shelved plans for additional mission chains 

Work on the coastal mission chain was concluded in 1823, completed after Serra's death in 1784. Plans to build a twenty-second mission in Santa Rosa in 1827 were canceled.

The Rev. Pedro Estévan Tápis proposed establishing a mission on one of the Channel Islands in the Pacific Ocean off San Pedro Harbor in 1784, with either Santa Catalina or Santa Cruz (known as Limú to the Tongva residents) being the most likely locations, the reasoning being that an offshore mission might have attracted potential people to convert who were not living on the mainland, and could have been an effective measure to restrict smuggling operations. Governor José Joaquín de Arrillaga approved the plan the following year; however, an outbreak of sarampión (measles) killing some 200 Tongva people coupled with a scarcity of land for agriculture and potable water left the success of such a venture in doubt, so no effort to found an island mission was ever made.

In September 1821, the Rev. Mariano Payeras, "Comisario Prefecto" of the California missions, visited Cañada de Santa Ysabel east of Mission San Diego de Alcalá as part of a plan to establish an entire chain of inland missions. The Santa Ysabel Asistencia had been founded in 1818 as a "mother" mission.   However, the plan's expansion never came to fruition.

Mission sites, selection and layout 

In addition to the presidio (royal fort) and pueblo (town), the misión was one of the three major agencies employed by the Spanish sovereign to extend its borders and consolidate its colonial territories. Asistencias ("satellite" or "sub" missions, sometimes referred to as "contributing chapels") were small-scale missions that regularly conducted Mass on days of obligation but lacked a resident priest; as with the missions, these settlements were typically established in areas with high concentrations of potential native converts. The Spanish Californians had never strayed from the coast when establishing their settlements; Mission Nuestra Señora de la Soledad was located farthest inland, being only some thirty miles (48 kilometers) from the shore. Each frontier station was forced to be self-supporting, as existing means of supply were inadequate to maintain a colony of any size. California was months away from the nearest base in colonized Mexico, and the cargo ships of the day were too small to carry more than a few months' rations in their holds. To sustain a mission, the padres required converted Native Americans, called neophytes, to cultivate crops and tend livestock in the volume needed to support a fair-sized establishment. The scarcity of imported materials, together with a lack of skilled laborers, compelled the missionaries to employ simple building materials and methods in the construction of mission structures.

Although the missions were considered temporary ventures by the Spanish hierarchy, the development of an individual settlement was not simply a matter of "priestly whim."  The founding of a mission followed longstanding rules and procedures; the paperwork involved required months, sometimes years of correspondence, and demanded the attention of virtually every level of the bureaucracy. Once empowered to erect a mission in a given area, the men assigned to it chose a specific site that featured a good water supply, plenty of wood for fires and building materials, and ample fields for grazing herds and raising crops. The padres blessed the site, and with the aid of their military escort fashioned temporary shelters out of tree limbs or driven stakes, roofed with thatch or reeds (cañas). It was these simple huts that ultimately gave way to the stone and adobe buildings that exist to the present.

The first priority when beginning a settlement was the location and construction of the church (iglesia). The majority of mission sanctuaries were oriented on a roughly east–west axis to take the best advantage of the sun's position for interior illumination; the exact alignment depended on the geographic features of the particular site. Once the spot for the church had been selected, its position was marked and the remainder of the mission complex was laid out. The workshops, kitchens, living quarters, storerooms, and other ancillary chambers were usually grouped in the form of a quadrangle, inside which religious celebrations and other festive events often took place. The cuadrángulo was rarely a perfect square because the missionaries had no surveying instruments at their disposal and simply measured off all dimensions by foot. Some fanciful accounts regarding the construction of the missions claimed that tunnels were incorporated in the design, to be used as a means of emergency egress in the event of attack; however, no historical evidence (written or physical) has ever been uncovered to support these assertions.

Franciscans and native conscription  

The Alta California missions, known as reductions (reducciones) or congregations (congregaciones), were settlements founded by the Spanish colonizers of the New World with the purpose of totally assimilating indigenous populations into European culture and the Catholic religion. It was a doctrine established in 1531, which based the Spanish state's right over the land and persons of the Indies on the Papal charge to evangelize them. It was employed wherever the indigenous populations were not already concentrated in native pueblos. Indians were congregated around the mission proper through forced resettlement, in which the Spanish  "reduced" them from what they perceived to be a free "undisciplined'" state with the ambition of converting them into "civilized" members of colonial society. The civilized and disciplined culture of the natives, developed over 8,000 years, was not considered. A total of 146 Friars Minor, mostly Spaniards by birth, were ordained as priests and served in California between 1769 and 1845. Sixty-seven missionaries died at their posts (two as martyrs: Padres Luis Jayme and Andrés Quintana), while the remainder returned to Europe due to illness, or upon completing their ten-year service commitment. As the rules of the Franciscan Order forbade friars to live alone, two missionaries were assigned to each settlement, sequestered in the mission's convento. To these the governor assigned a guard of five or six soldiers under the command of a corporal, who generally acted as steward of the mission's temporal affairs, subject to the priests' direction.

Indians were initially attracted into the mission compounds by gifts of food, colored beads, bits of bright cloth, and trinkets. Once a Native American "gentile" was baptized, they were labeled a neophyte, or new believer. This happened only after a brief period during which the initiates were instructed in the most basic aspects of the Catholic faith. But, while many natives were lured to join the missions out of curiosity and sincere desire to participate and engage in trade, many found themselves trapped once they were baptized. On the other hand, Indians staffed the militias at each mission and had a role in mission governance.

To the padres, a baptized Indian person was no longer free to move about the country, but had to labor and worship at the mission under the strict observance of the priests and overseers, who herded them to daily masses and labors. If an Indian did not report for their duties for a period of a few days, they were searched for, and if it was discovered that they had left without permission, they were considered runaways. Large-scale military expeditions were organized to round up the escaped neophytes. Sometimes, the Franciscans allowed neophytes to escape the missions, or they would allow them to visit their home village. However, the Franciscans would only allow this so that they could secretly follow the neophytes. Upon arriving to the village and capturing the runaways, they would take back Indians to the missions, sometimes as many as 200 to 300 Indians.

A total of 20,355 natives were "attached" to the California missions in 1806 (the highest figure recorded during the Mission Period); under Mexican rule the number rose to 21,066 (in 1824, the record year during the entire era of the Franciscan missions). During the entire period of Mission rule, from 1769 to 1834, the Franciscans baptized 53,600 adult Indians and buried 37,000. Dr. Cook estimates that 15,250 or 45% of the population decrease was caused by disease. Two epidemics of measles, one in 1806 and the other in 1828, caused many deaths. The mortality rates were so high that the missions were constantly dependent upon new conversions.

Young native women were required to reside in the monjerío (or "nunnery") under the supervision of a trusted Indian matron who bore the responsibility for their welfare and education. Women only left the convent after they had been "won" by an Indian suitor and were deemed ready for marriage. Following Spanish custom, courtship took place on either side of a barred window. After the marriage ceremony the woman moved out of the mission compound and into one of the family huts. These "nunneries" were considered a necessity by the priests, who felt the women needed to be protected from the men, both Indian and de razón ("instructed men", i.e. Europeans). The cramped and unsanitary conditions the girls lived in contributed to the fast spread of disease and population decline. So many died at times that many of the Indian residents of the missions urged the priests to raid new villages to supply them with more women.

Death rate at the missions 
As of December 31, 1832 (the peak of the mission system's development) the mission padres had performed a combined total of 87,787 baptisms and 24,529 marriages, and recorded 63,789 deaths. The death rate at the missions, particularly of children, was very high and the majority of children baptized did not survive childhood. At Mission San Gabriel, for instance, three of four children died before reaching the age of two. 

The high rate of death at the missions have been attributed to several factors, including disease, torture, overworking, malnourishment, and cultural genocide. Forcing native people into close quarters at the missions spread disease quickly. While being kept at the missions, native people were transitioned to a Spanish diet that left them more unable to ward off diseases, the most common being dysentery, fevers with unknown causes, and venereal disease. 

The death rate has been compared to that of other atrocities. American author and lawyer Carey McWilliams argued that "the Franciscan padres eliminated Indians with the effectiveness of Nazis operating concentration camps."

Mission labor 
At least 90,000 Indigenous peoples were kept in well-guarded mission compounds throughout the state as de facto slaves. The policy of the Franciscans was to keep them constantly occupied. Bells were vitally important to daily life at any mission. The bells were rung at mealtimes, to call the Mission residents to work and to religious services, during births and funerals, to signal the approach of a ship or returning missionary, and at other times; novices were instructed in the intricate rituals associated with the ringing the mission bells. The daily routine began with sunrise Mass and morning prayers, followed by instruction of the natives in the teachings of the Roman Catholic faith. After a breakfast of atole, the able-bodied men and women were assigned their tasks for the day. The women were committed to dressmaking, knitting, weaving, embroidering, laundering, and cooking, while some of the stronger girls ground flour or carried adobe bricks (weighing 55 lb, or 25 kg each) to the men engaged in building. The men worked a variety of jobs, having learned from the missionaries how to plow, sow, irrigate, cultivate, reap, thresh, and glean. They were taught to build adobe houses, tan leather hides, shear sheep, weave rugs and clothing from wool, make ropes, soap, paint, and other useful duties.

The work day was six hours, interrupted by dinner (lunch) around 11:00 a.m. and a two-hour siesta, and ended with evening prayers and the rosary, supper, and social activities. About 90 days out of each year were designated as religious or civil holidays, free from manual labor. The labor organization of the missions resembled a slave plantation in many respects. Foreigners who visited the missions remarked at how the priests' control over the Indians appeared excessive, but necessary given the white men's isolation and numeric disadvantage. Subsequently, the Missions operated under strict and harsh conditions; A 'light' punishment would've been considered 25 lashings (azotes). Indians were not paid wages as they were not considered free laborers and, as a result, the missions were able to profit from the goods produced by the Mission Indians to the detriment of the other Spanish and Mexican settlers of the time who could not compete economically with the advantage of the mission system.

The Franciscans began to send neophytes to work as servants of Spanish soldiers in the presidios. Each presidio was provided with land, el rancho del rey, which served as a pasture for the presidio livestock and as a source of food for the soldiers. Theoretically the soldiers were supposed to work on this land themselves but within a few years the neophytes were doing all the work on the presidio farm and, in addition, were serving domestics for the soldiers. While the fiction prevailed that neophytes were to receive wages for their work, no attempt was made to collect the wages for these services after 1790. It is recorded that the neophytes performed the work "under unmitigated compulsion."

In recent years, much debate has arisen about the priests' treatment of the Indians during the Mission period, and many believe that the California mission system is directly responsible for the decline of the native cultures. From the perspective of the Spanish priest, their efforts were a well-meaning attempt to improve the lives of the heathen natives.

Franciscan violence against the native population
The Franciscan arrival to Alta California, saw a wave of torture, rape, and murder towards the Native population of California. Native Californians, attracted to the Missions by the promise of food and gifts, would be banned from leaving and any form of escape would usually be met with a severe beating and chaining. Any form of Native rebellion would not be tolerated due to numerical disadvantage facing the Franciscans. When Native Women attempted to abort their unborn children – which they had conceived as a byproduct of rape, The Friars would have them beaten, chained in iron, shaved, and stipulated to stand in-front of the altar each mass with a decorated wooden newborn.
This trend of violence was due to the Franciscans' desire for a greater Hispanicized population in Alta California, both for protection against a foreign invasion and for a labor force to benefit the Spanish Empire. As a result a higher emphasis of Native reproduction was a duty taken on by the Spanish Fransicans. Tejana Born Feminist Historian, Antonia Castañeda reports in great detail of the treatment that would occur in Mission Santa Cruz:

"Father Olbes at Mission Santa Cruz ordered an infertile couple to have sexual intercourse in his presence because he did not believe they could not have children. The couple refused, but Olbes forcibly inspected the man's penis to learn 'whether or not it was in good order' and tried to inspect the woman's genitalia.13 She refused, fought with him, and tried to bite him. Olbes ordered that she be tied by the hands, and given fifty lashes, shackled, and locked up in the monjerío (women's dormitory). He then had a monigote made and commanded that she "treat the doll as though it were a child and carry it in the presence of everyone for nine days." While the woman was beaten and her sexuality demeaned, the husband, who had been intimate with another woman, was ridiculed and humiliated. A set of cow horns was tied to his head with leather thongs, thereby converting him into a cuckold, and he was herded to daily Mass in cow horns and fetters".

Franciscan Priests would also forbid any form of native culture in the Mission system. This would include but not be limited to, songs, dances, and ceremonies. They objectified the destruction of any form of morality, ideology or personality that characterized the Native life. 
Women, in particular, would face a higher degree of punishment. Those who did not comply with the Missions demands would be labeled a witch, dehumanizing them for further violence. Professor at the University of Chicago, Ramon Guttiriez states:
"One can interpret the whole history of the persecution of Indian women as witches ... as a struggle over [these] competing ways of defining the body and of regulating procreation as the church endeavored to constrain the expression of desire within boundaries that clerics defined proper and acceptable."{ Gutierrez, "Sexual Mores and Behavior," 701.}

Mission industries 

The goal of the missions was, above all, to become self-sufficient in relatively short order. Farming, therefore, was the most important industry of any mission. Barley, maize, and wheat were among the most common crops grown. Cereal grains were dried and ground by stone into flour. Even today, California is well known for the abundance and many varieties of fruit trees that are cultivated throughout the state. The only fruits indigenous to the region, however, consisted of wild berries or grew on small bushes. Spanish missionaries brought fruit seeds over from Europe, many of which had been introduced from Asia following earlier expeditions to the continent; orange, grape, apple, peach, pear, and fig seeds were among the most prolific of the imports. Grapes were also grown and fermented into wine for sacramental use and again, for trading. The specific variety, called the Criolla or Mission grape, was first planted at Mission San Juan Capistrano in 1779; in 1783, the first wine produced in Alta California emerged from the mission's winery. Ranching also became an important mission industry as cattle and sheep herds were raised.

Mission San Gabriel Arcángel unknowingly witnessed the origin of the California citrus industry with the planting of the region's first significant orchard in 1804, though the commercial potential of citrus was not realized until 1841. Olives (first cultivated at Mission San Diego de Alcalá) were grown, cured, and pressed under large stone wheels to extract their oil, both for use at the mission and to trade for other goods. The Rev. Serra set aside a portion of the Mission Carmel gardens in 1774 for tobacco plants, a practice that soon spread throughout the mission system.

It was also the missions' responsibility to provide the Spanish forts, or presidios, with the necessary foodstuffs, and manufactured goods to sustain operations. It was a constant point of contention between missionaries and the soldiers as to how many fanegas of barley, or how many shirts or blankets the mission had to provide the garrisons on any given year. At times these requirements were hard to meet, especially during years of drought, or when the much anticipated shipments from the port of San Blas failed to arrive. The Spaniards kept meticulous records of mission activities, and each year reports submitted to the Father-Presidente summarizing both the material and spiritual status at each of the settlements.

Livestock was raised, not only for the purpose of obtaining meat, but also for wool, leather, and tallow, and for cultivating the land. In 1832, at the height of their prosperity, the missions collectively owned:

 151,180 head of cattle;
 137,969 sheep;
 14,522 horses;
 1,575 mules or burros;
 1,711 goats; and
 1,164 swine.

All these grazing animals were originally brought up from Mexico. A great many Indians were required to guard the herds and flocks on the mission ranches, which created the need for "...a class of horsemen scarcely surpassed anywhere." These animals multiplied beyond the settler's expectations, often overrunning pastures and extending well-beyond the domains of the missions. The giant herds of horses and cows took well to the climate and the extensive pastures of the Coastal California region, but at a heavy price for the California Native American people. The uncontrolled spread of these new herds, and associated invasive exotic plant species, quickly exhausted the native plants in the grasslands, and the chaparral and woodlands that the Indians depended on for their seed, foliage, and bulb harvests. The grazing-overgrazing problems were also recognized by the Spaniards, who periodically had extermination parties cull and kill thousands of excess livestock, when herd populations grew beyond their control or the land's capacity. Years with a severe drought did this also.

Mission kitchens and bakeries prepared and served thousands of meals each day. Candles, soap, grease, and ointments were all made from tallow (rendered animal fat) in large vats located just outside the west wing. Also situated in this general area were vats for dyeing wool and tanning leather, and primitive looms for weaving. Large bodegas (warehouses) provided long-term storage for preserved foodstuffs and other treated materials.

Each mission had to fabricate virtually all of its construction materials from local materials. Workers in the carpintería (carpentry shop) used crude methods to shape beams, lintels, and other structural elements; more skilled artisans carved doors, furniture, and wooden implements. For certain applications bricks (ladrillos) were fired in ovens (kilns) to strengthen them and make them more resistant to the elements; when tejas (roof tiles) eventually replaced the conventional jacal roofing (densely packed reeds) they were placed in the kilns to harden them as well. Glazed ceramic pots, dishes, and canisters were also made in mission kilns.

Prior to the establishment of the missions, the native peoples knew only how to utilize bone, seashells, stone, and wood for building, tool making, weapons, and so forth. The missionaries established manual training in European skills and methods; in agriculture, mechanical arts, and the raising and care of livestock. Everything consumed and otherwise utilized by the natives was produced at the missions under the supervision of the padres; thus, the neophytes not only supported themselves, but after 1811 sustained the entire military and civil government of California. The foundry at Mission San Juan Capistrano was the first to introduce the Indians to the Iron Age. The blacksmith used the mission's forges (California's first) to smelt and fashion iron into everything from basic tools and hardware (such as nails) to crosses, gates, hinges, even cannon for mission defense. Iron in particular was a commodity that the mission acquired solely through trade, as the missionaries had neither the know-how nor technology to mine and process metal ores.

No study of the missions is complete without mention of their extensive water supply systems. Stone zanjas (aqueducts, sometimes spanning miles, brought fresh water from a nearby river or spring to the mission site. Open or covered lined ditches and/or baked clay pipes, joined together with lime mortar or bitumen, gravity-fed the water into large cisterns and fountains, and emptied into waterways where the force of the water was used to turn grinding wheels and other simple machinery, or dispensed for use in cleaning. Water used for drinking and cooking was allowed to trickle through alternate layers of sand and charcoal to remove the impurities. One of the best-preserved mission water systems is at Mission Santa Barbara.

History 

Beginning in 1492 with the voyages of Christopher Columbus, the Kingdom of Spain sought to establish missions to convert indigenous people in Nueva España (New Spain), which consisted of the Caribbean, Mexico, and most of what is now the Southwestern United States) to Catholicism. This would facilitate colonization of these lands awarded to Spain by the Catholic Church, including that region later known as Alta California.

Early Spanish exploration 

Only 48 years after Columbus discovered the Americas for Europe, Francisco Vázquez de Coronado set out from Compostela, New Spain on February 23, 1540, at the head of a large expedition. Accompanied by 400 European men-at-arms (mostly Spaniards), 1,300 to 2,000 Mexican Indian allies, several Indian and African slaves, and four Franciscan friars, he traveled from Mexico through parts of the southwestern United States to present-day Kansas between 1540 and 1542. Two years later on 27 June 1542, Juan Rodriguez Cabrillo set out from Navidad, Mexico and sailed up the coast of Baja California and into the region of Alta California.

Secret English claims 

Unknown to Spain, Sir Francis Drake, an English privateer who raided Spanish treasure ships and colonial settlements, claimed the Alta California region as Nova Albion for the English Crown in 1579, a full generation before the first English landing in Jamestown in 1607. During his circumnavigation of the world, Drake anchored in a harbor just north of present-day San Francisco, California, establishing friendly relations with the Coastal Miwok and claiming the territory for Queen Elizabeth I. However, Drake sailed back to England and England (and later Britain) never pressed for any sort of claim regarding the region.

Russian exploration 

However, it was not until 1741 that the Spanish monarchy of King Philip V was stimulated to consider how to protect his claims to Alta California. Philip was spurred on when the territorial ambitions of the Russian Empire were expressed in the Vitus Bering expedition along the western coast on the North American continent.

Spanish expansion 

California represents the "high-water mark" of Spanish expansion in North America as the last and northernmost colony on the continent. The mission system arose in part from the need to control Spain's ever-expanding holdings in the New World. Realizing that the colonies required a literate population base that the mother country could not supply, the Spanish government (with the cooperation of the Church) established a network of missions to convert the indigenous population to Christianity. They aimed to make converts and tax-paying citizens of those they conquered. To make them into Spanish citizens and productive inhabitants, the Spanish government and the Church required the indigenous people to learn Spanish language and vocational skills along with Christian teachings.

Estimates for the pre-contact indigenous population in California are based on a number of different sources and vary substantially, from 133,000, to 225,000, to as high as 705,000 from more than 100 separate tribes or nations.

On January 29, 1767, Spain's King Charles III ordered the new governor Gaspar de Portolá to forcibly expel the Jesuits, who operated under the authority of the Pope and had established a chain of fifteen missions on the Baja California Peninsula. Visitador General José de Gálvez engaged the Franciscans, under the leadership of Friar Junípero Serra, to take charge of those outposts on March 12, 1768. The padres closed or consolidated several of the existing settlements, and also founded Misión San Fernando Rey de España de Velicatá (the only Franciscan mission in all of Baja California) and the nearby Visita de la Presentación in 1769. This plan, however, changed within a few months after Gálvez received the following orders: "Occupy and fortify San Diego and Monterey for God and the King of Spain." The Church ordered the priests of the Dominican Order to take charge of the Baja California missions so the Franciscans could concentrate on founding new missions in Alta California.

Mission period (1769–1833) 

On July 14, 1769, Gálvez sent the Portolá expedition out from Loreto to explore lands to the north. Leader Gaspar de Portolá was accompanied by a group of Franciscans led by Junípero Serra. Serra's plan was to extend the string of missions north from the Baja California peninsula, connected by an established road and spaced a day's travel apart. The first Alta California mission and presidio were founded at San Diego, the second at Monterey.

En route to Monterey, the Rev. Francisco Gómez and the Rev. Juan Crespí came across a Native settlement wherein two young girls were dying: one, a baby, said to be "dying at its mother's breast," the other a small girl suffering of burns. On July 22, Gómez baptized the baby, naming her Maria Magdalena, while Crespí baptized the older child, naming her Margarita. These were the first recorded baptisms in Alta California. Crespi dubbed the spot Los Cristianos. The group continued northward but missed Monterey Harbor and returned to San Diego on January 24, 1770. Near the end of 1769 the Portolá expedition had reached its most northerly point at present-day San Francisco. In following years, the Spanish Crown sent a number of follow-up expeditions to explore more of Alta California.

Spain also settled the California region with a number of African and mulatto Catholics, including at least ten of the recently re-discovered Los Pobladores, the founders of Los Angeles in 1781.

Structure 
Each mission was to be turned over to a secular clergy and all the common mission lands distributed amongst the native population within ten years after its founding, a policy that was based upon Spain's experience with the more advanced tribes in Mexico, Central America, and Peru. In time, it became apparent to the Rev. Serra and his associates that the natives on the northern frontier in Alta California required a much longer period of acclimatization. None of the California missions ever attained complete self-sufficiency, and required continued (albeit modest) financial support from mother Spain. Mission development was therefore financed out of El Fondo Piadoso de las Californias (The Pious Fund of the Californias, which originated in 1697 and consisted of voluntary donations from individuals and religious bodies in Mexico to members of the Society of Jesus) to enable the missionaries to propagate the Catholic Faith in the area then known as California. Starting with the onset of the Mexican War of Independence in 1810, this support largely disappeared, and missions and converts were left on their own. As of 1800, native labor had made up the backbone of the colonial economy.

Arguably "the worst epidemic of the Spanish Era in California" was known to be the measles epidemic of 1806, wherein one-quarter of the mission Native American population of the San Francisco Bay Area died of the measles or related complications between March and May of that year. In 1811, the Spanish Viceroy in Mexico sent an interrogatorio (questionnaire) to all of the missions in Alta California regarding the customs, disposition, and condition of the Mission Indians. The replies, which varied greatly in the length, spirit, and even the value of the information contained therein, were collected and prefaced by the Father-Presidente with a short general statement or abstract; the compilation was thereupon forwarded to the viceregal government. The contemporary nature of the responses, no matter how incomplete or biased some may be, are nonetheless of considerable value to modern ethnologists.

Russian colonization of the Americas reached its southernmost point with the 1812 establishment of Fort Ross (krepost' rus), an agricultural, scientific, and fur trading settlement located in present-day Sonoma County, California. In November and December 1818, several of the missions were attacked by Hipólito Bouchard, "California's only pirate." A French privateer sailing under the flag of Argentina, Pirata Buchar (as Bouchard was known to the locals) worked his way down the California coast, conducting raids on the installations at Monterey, Santa Barbara, and San Juan Capistrano, with limited success. Upon hearing of the attacks, many mission priests (along with a few government officials) sought refuge at Mission Nuestra Señora de la Soledad, the mission chain's most isolated outpost. Ironically, Mission Santa Cruz (though ultimately ignored by the marauders) was ignominiously sacked and vandalized by local residents who were entrusted with securing the church's valuables.

By 1819, Spain decided to limit its "reach" in the New World to Northern California due to the costs involved in sustaining these remote outposts; the northernmost settlement therefore is Mission San Francisco Solano, founded in Sonoma in 1823. The Chumash people revolted against the Spanish presence in 1824. The Chumash planned a coordinated rebellion at three missions. Due to an incident with a soldier at Mission Santa Inés, the rebellion began on Saturday, February 21. The Chumash withdrew from Mission Santa Inés upon the arrival of military reinforcements, then attacked Mission La Purisima from inside, forced the garrison to surrender, and allowed the garrison, their families, and the mission priest to depart for Santa Inés. The next day, the Chumash of Mission Santa Barbara captured the mission from within without bloodshed, repelled a military attack on the mission, and then retreated from the mission to the hills. The Chumash continued to occupy Mission La Purisima until a Mexican military unit attacked people on March 16 and forced them to surrender. Two military expeditions were sent after the Chumash in the hills; the first did not find them and the second negotiated with the Chumash and convinced a majority to return to the missions by June 28.

An attempt to found a twenty-second mission in Santa Rosa in 1827 was aborted. In 1833, the final group of missionaries arrived in Alta California. These were Mexican-born (rather than Spaniards), and had been trained at the Apostolic College of Our Lady of Guadalupe in Zacatecas. Among these friars was Francisco García Diego y Moreno, who would become the first bishop of the Diocese of Both Californias. These friars would bear the brunt of the changes brought on by secularization and the U.S. occupation, and many would be marked by allegations of corruption.

Secularization 

As the Mexican republic matured, calls for the secularization ("disestablishment") of the missions increased.

José María de Echeandía, the first native Mexican elected Governor of Alta California issued a "Proclamation of Emancipation"  (or "Prevenciónes de Emancipacion") on July 25, 1826. All Indians within the military districts of San Diego, Santa Barbara, and Monterey who were found qualified were freed from missionary rule and made eligible to become Mexican citizens. Those who wished to remain under mission tutelage were exempted from most forms of corporal punishment. By 1830, even the neophyte populations themselves appeared confident in their own abilities to operate the mission ranches and farms independently; the padres, however, doubted the capabilities of their charges in this regard.

Accelerating immigration, both Mexican and foreign, increased pressure on the Alta California government to seize the mission properties and dispossess the natives in accordance with Echeandía's directive. Despite the fact that Echeandía's emancipation plan was met with little encouragement from the novices who populated the southern missions, he was nonetheless determined to test the scheme on a large scale at Mission San Juan Capistrano. To that end, he appointed a number of comisionados (commissioners) to oversee the emancipation of the Indians. The Mexican government passed legislation on December 20, 1827 that mandated the expulsion of all Spaniards younger than sixty years of age from Mexican territories; Governor Echeandía nevertheless intervened on behalf of some of the missionaries to prevent their deportation once the law took effect in California.

Governor José Figueroa (who took office in 1833) initially attempted to keep the mission system intact, but the Mexican Congress passed An Act for the Secularization of the Missions of California on August 17, 1833 when liberal Valentín Gómez Farías was in office.

The Act also provided for the colonization of both Alta and Baja California, the expenses of this latter move to be borne by the proceeds gained from the sale of the mission property to private interests.

For instance, after Mexican independence, the Mexican government confiscated Franciscan lands and decommissioned them. This, however, did not see the end of Native plight since further dislocation and abuse occurred under Mexican control. Most of the confiscated Franciscan lands were given out as grants to white settlers or well connected Mexicans, while Native Californians continued to occupy the land as a labor force.

Mission San Juan Capistrano was the very first to feel the effects of secularization when, on August 9, 1834 Governor Figueroa issued his "Decree of Confiscation." Nine other settlements quickly followed, with six more in 1835; San Buenaventura and San Francisco de Asís were among the last to succumb, in June and December 1836, respectively. The Franciscans soon thereafter abandoned most of the missions, taking with them almost everything of value, after which the locals typically plundered the mission buildings for construction materials. Former mission pasture lands were divided into large land grants called ranchos, greatly increasing the number of private land holdings in Alta California.

Rancho period (1834–1849) 

In spite of this neglect, the Indian towns at San Juan Capistrano, San Dieguito, and Las Flores did continue on for some time under a provision in Gobernador Echeandía's 1826 Proclamation that allowed for the partial conversion of missions to pueblos. According to one estimate, the native population in and around the missions proper was approximately 80,000 at the time of the confiscation; others claim that the statewide population had dwindled to approximately 100,000 by the early 1840s, due in no small part to the natives' exposure to European diseases, and from the Franciscan practice of cloistering women in the convento and controlling sexuality during the child-bearing age. (Baja California Territory experienced a similar reduction in native population resulting from Spanish colonization efforts there).

Pío de Jesús Pico, the last Mexican Governor of Alta California, found upon taking office that there were few funds available to carry on the affairs of the province. He prevailed upon the assembly to pass a decree authorizing the renting or the sale of all mission property, reserving only the church, a curate's house, and a building for a courthouse. The expenses of conducting the services of the church were to be provided from the proceeds, but there was no disposition made as to what should be done to secure the funds for that purpose. After secularization, Father-Presidente Narciso Durán transferred the missions' headquarters to Santa Bárbara, thereby making Mission Santa Bárbara the repository of some 3,000 original documents that had been scattered through the California missions. The Mission archive is the oldest library in the State of California that still remains in the hands of its founders, the Franciscans (it is the only mission where they have maintained an uninterrupted presence). Beginning with the writings of Hubert Howe Bancroft, the library has served as a center for historical study of the missions for more than a century. In 1895, journalist and historian Charles Fletcher Lummis criticized the Act and its results, saying:

California statehood (1850 and beyond) 

Precise figures relating to the population decline of California indigenes are not available. One writer, Gregory Orfalea, estimates that pre-contact population was reduced by 33 percent during Spanish and Mexican rule, mostly through introduction of European diseases, but much more after the United States takeover in 1848. By 1870, the loss of indigenous lives had become catastrophic. Up to 80 percent died, leaving a population of about 30,000 in 1870. Orfalea claims that nearly half of the native deaths after 1848 were murder.

In 1837–38, a major smallpox epidemic devastated native tribes north of San Francisco Bay, in the jurisdiction of Mission San Francisco Solano. General Mariano Vallejo estimated that 70,000 died from the disease. Vallejo's ally, chief Sem-Yeto, was one of the few natives to be vaccinated, and one of the few to survive.

When the mission properties were secularized between 1834 and 1838, the approximately 15,000 resident neophytes lost whatever protection the mission system afforded them. While under the secularization laws the natives were to receive up to one-half of the mission properties, this never happened. The natives lost whatever stock and movable property they may have accumulated. When California became a U.S. state, California law stripped them of legal title to the land. In the Act of September 30, 1850, Congress appropriated funds to allow the President to appoint three Commissioners, O. M. Wozencraft, Redick McKee and George W. Barbour, to study the California situation and "...negotiate treaties with the various Indian tribes of California." Treaty negotiations ensued during the period between March 19, 1851 and January 7, 1852, during which the Commission interacted with 402 Indian chiefs and headmen (representing approximately one-third to one-half of the California tribes) and entered into eighteen treaties.

California Senator William M. Gwin's Act of March 3, 1851 created the Public Land Commission, whose purpose was to determine the validity of Spanish and Mexican land grants in California. On February 19, 1853 Archbishop Joseph Sadoc Alemany filed petitions for the return of all former mission lands in the state. As the result of a U.S. government investigation in 1873, a number of Indian reservations were assigned by executive proclamation in 1875. The commissioner of Indian affairs reported in 1879 that the number of Mission Indians in the state was down to around 3,000.

Legacy and Native American controversy 

There is controversy over the California Department of Education's treatment of the missions in the Department's elementary curriculum; in the tradition of historical revisionism, it has been alleged that the curriculum "waters down" the harsh treatment of Native Americans. Some modern anthropologists cite a cultural bias on the part of the missionaries that blinded them to the natives' plight and caused them to develop strong negative opinions of the California Indians. European diseases like influenza, measles, tuberculosis, gonorrhea, and dysentery caused a significant population reduction from the first encounter through the 19th century as California Native Americans had no immunity to these diseases. These deaths, however, where only made worse by the treatment Native Californians faced at the hands of Settlers. Associate professor Benjamin Madly at the University of California, Los Angeles states:

"Between 1846 and 1870, California's Indian population plunged from perhaps 150,000 to 30,000. Diseases, dislocation, and starvation caused many of these deaths. However, abduction, unfree labor, mass death on reservations, individual homicides, battles, and massacres also took thousands of lives and hindered reproduction"

The impact that the original Spanish system of colonization had on modern day California cannot be overstated.  Although the certain cooperation between Church and State that was part and parcel of the original California mission system was soon discarded by the Mexican government, it nonetheless provided a foundation upon which later forms of government would soon be established. The early missions and their sub-missions formed the nuclei of what would later become the major metropolitan areas of San Francisco and Los Angeles, as well as many other smaller municipalities. In addition to clearing the way for Spanish, Mexican, and later American settlers, the early Spanish mission system established the viability of the early Western economies of cattle and agriculture which survive in modern form in the state to this day.  The Spanish mission system acted to "settle and Westernize" California, but unfortunately did so very much at the expense of the earlier Native American Culture of California that had preceded the Spanish mission system.

Mission administration, locations and military districts

System Father-Presidentes  

 The Rev. Junípero Serra (1769–1784)
 The Rev. Francisco Palóu (presidente pro tempore) (1784–1785)
 The Rev. Fermín Francisco de Lasuén (1785–1803)
 The Rev. Pedro Estévan Tápis (1803–1812)
 The Rev. José Francisco de Paula Señan (1812–1815)
 The Rev. Mariano Payéras (1815–1820)
 The Rev. José Francisco de Paula Señan (1820–1823)
 The Rev. Vicente Francisco de Sarría (1823–1824)
 The Rev. Narciso Durán (1824–1827)
 The Rev. José Bernardo Sánchez (1827–1831)
 The Rev. Narciso Durán (1831–1838)
 The Rev. José Joaquin Jimeno (1838–1844)
 The Rev. Narciso Durán (1844–1846)

The "Father-Presidente" was the head of the Catholic missions in Alta and Baja California. He was appointed by the College of San Fernando de Mexico until 1812, when the position became known as the "Commissary Prefect" who was appointed by the Commissary General of the Indies (a Franciscan residing in Spain). Beginning in 1831, separate individuals were elected to oversee Upper and Lower California.

Mission headquarters  

 Mission San Diego de Alcalá (1769–1771)
 Mission San Carlos Borromeo de Carmelo (1771–1815)
 Mission La Purísima Concepción*(1815–1819)
 Mission San Carlos Borromeo de Carmelo (1819–1824)
 Mission San José*(1824–1827)
 Mission San Carlos Borromeo de Carmelo (1827–1830)
 Mission San José*(1830–1833)
 Mission Santa Barbara (1833–1846)

† The Rev. Payeras and the Rev. Durán remained at their resident missions during their terms as Father-Presidente, therefore those settlements became the de facto headquarters (until 1833, when all mission records were permanently relocated to Santa Barbara).

Mission locations 

There were 21 missions accompanied by military outposts in Alta California from San Diego to Sonoma, California. To facilitate travel between them on horse and foot, the mission settlements were situated approximately 30 miles (48 kilometers) apart, about one day's journey on horseback, or three days on foot. The entire trail eventually became a 600-mile (966-kilometer) long "California Mission Trail." Heavy freight movement was practical only via water. Tradition has it that the padres sprinkled mustard seeds along the trail to mark it with bright yellow flowers.

Following the old Camino Real northwards, from San Diego through to the northernmost mission in Sonoma, California, north of San Francisco Bay, the missions were:

Military districts 

During the Mission Period Alta California was divided into four military districts. Each was garrisoned (comandancias) by a presidio strategically placed along the California coast to protect the missions and other Spanish settlements in Upper California. Each of these functioned as a base of military operations for a specific region. They were independent of one another and were organized from south to north as follows:

 El Presidio Real de San Diego founded on July 16, 1769 – responsible for the defense of all installations located within the First Military District (the missions at San Diego, San Luis Rey, San Juan Capistrano, and San Gabriel);
 El Presidio Real de Santa Bárbara founded on April 12, 1782 – responsible for the defense of all installations located within the Second Military District (the missions at San Fernando, San Buenaventura, Santa Barbara, Santa Inés, and La Purísima, along with El Pueblo de Nuestra Señora la Reina de los Ángeles del Río de Porciúncula [Los Angeles]);
 El Presidio Real de San Carlos de Monterey (El Castillo) founded on June 3, 1770 – responsible for the defense of all installations located within the Third Military District (the missions at San Luis Obispo, San Miguel, San Antonio, Soledad, San Carlos, and San Juan Bautista, along with Villa Branciforte [Santa Cruz]); and
 El Presidio Real de San Francisco founded on December 17, 1776 – responsible for the defense of all installations located within the Fourth Military District (the missions at Santa Cruz, San José, Santa Clara, San Francisco, San Rafael, and Solano, along with El Pueblo de San José de Guadalupe [San Jose]).
 El Presidio de Sonoma, or "Sonoma Barracks" (a collection of guardhouses, storerooms, living quarters, and an observation tower) was established in 1836 by Mariano Guadalupe Vallejo (the "Commandante-General of the Northern Frontier of Alta California") as a part of Mexico's strategy to halt Russian incursions into the region. The Sonoma Presidio became the new headquarters of the Mexican Army in California, while the remaining presidios were essentially abandoned and, in time, fell into ruins.

An ongoing power struggle between church and state grew increasingly heated and lasted for decades. Originating as a feud between the Rev. Serra and Pedro Fages (the military governor of Alta California from 1770 to 1774, who regarded the Spanish installations in California as military institutions first and religious outposts second), the uneasy relationship persisted for more than sixty years. Dependent upon one another for their very survival, military leaders and mission padres nevertheless adopted conflicting stances regarding everything from land rights, the allocation of supplies, protection of the missions, the criminal propensities of the soldiers, and (in particular) the status of the native populations.

Present-day California missions

Building restoration 

California is home to the greatest number of well-preserved missions found in any U.S. state. The missions are collectively the best-known historic element of the coastal regions of California:

 Most of the missions are still owned and operated by some entity within the Catholic Church.
 Three of the missions are still run under the auspices of the Franciscan Order (Santa Barbara, San Miguel Arcángel, and San Luis Rey de Francia)
 Four of the missions (San Diego de Alcalá, San Carlos Borromeo de Carmelo, San Francisco de Asís, and San Juan Capistrano) have been designated minor basilicas by the Holy See due to their cultural, historic, architectural, and religious importance.
 Mission La Purísima Concepción, Mission San Francisco Solano, and the one remaining mission-era structure of Mission Santa Cruz are owned and operated by the California Department of Parks and Recreation as State Historic Parks;
 Seven mission sites are designated National Historic Landmarks, fourteen are listed in the National Register of Historic Places, and all are designated as California Historical Landmarks for their historic, architectural, and archaeological significance.

Because virtually all of the artwork at the missions served either a devotional or didactic purpose, there was no underlying reason for the mission residents to record their surroundings graphically; visitors, however, found them to be objects of curiosity. During the 1850s a number of artists found gainful employment as draftsmen attached to expeditions sent to map the Pacific coastline and the border between California and Mexico (as well as plot practical railroad routes); many of the drawings were reproduced as lithographs in the expedition reports.

In 1875 American illustrator Henry Chapman Ford began visiting each of the twenty-one mission sites, where he created a historically important portfolio of watercolors, oils, and etchings. His depictions of the missions were (in part) responsible for the revival of interest in the state's Spanish heritage, and indirectly for the restoration of the missions. The 1880s saw the appearance of a number of articles on the missions in national publications and the first books on the subject; as a result, a large number of artists did one or more mission paintings, though few attempted a series.

The popularity of the missions also stemmed largely from Helen Hunt Jackson's 1884 novel Ramona and the subsequent efforts of Charles Fletcher Lummis, William Randolph Hearst, and other members of the "Landmarks Club of Southern California" to restore three of the southern missions in the early 20th century (San Juan Capistrano, San Diego de Alcalá, and San Fernando; the Pala Asistencia was also restored by this effort). Lummis wrote in 1895,

In acknowledgement of the magnitude of the restoration efforts required and the urgent need to have acted quickly to prevent further or even total degradation, Lummis went on to state, It is no exaggeration to say that human power could not have restored these four missions had there been a five-year delay in the attempt.

In 1911 author John Steven McGroarty penned The Mission Play, a three-hour pageant describing the California missions from their founding in 1769 through secularization in 1834, and ending with their "final ruin" in 1847.

Today, the missions exist in varying degrees of architectural integrity and structural soundness. The most common extant features at the mission grounds include the church building and an ancillary convento (convent) wing. In some cases (in San Rafael, Santa Cruz, and Soledad, for example), the current buildings are replicas constructed on or near the original site. Other mission compounds remain relatively intact and true to their original, Mission Era construction.

A notable example of an intact complex is the now-threatened Mission San Miguel Arcángel: its chapel retains the original interior murals created by Salinan Indians under the direction of Esteban Munras, a Spanish artist and last Spanish diplomat to California. This structure was closed to the public from 2003 to 2009 due to severe damage from the San Simeon earthquake. Many missions have preserved (or in some cases reconstructed) historic features in addition to chapel buildings.

The missions have earned a prominent place in California's historic consciousness, and a steady stream of tourists from all over the world visit them. In recognition of that fact, on November 30, 2004 President George W. Bush signed HR 1446, the California Mission Preservation Act, into law. The measure provided $10 million over a five-year period to the California Missions Foundation for projects related to the physical preservation of the missions, including structural rehabilitation, stabilization, and conservation of mission art and artifacts. The California Missions Foundation, a volunteer, tax-exempt organization, was founded in 1998 by Richard Ameil, an eighth generation Californian. A change to the California Constitution has also been proposed that would allow the use of State funds in restoration efforts.

Structures gallery

See also 

On California Missions:
 List of Spanish missions in California
 San Antonio de Pala Asistencia, not a full mission, but still serving the Pala reservation

On California history:
 Juan Bautista de Anza National Historic Trail
 History of California through 1899
 History of the west coast of North America
 Mission Vieja

On general missionary history:
 Catholic Church and the Age of Discovery
 History of Christian Missions
 List of the oldest churches in Mexico
 Missionary

On colonial Spanish American history:
 Spanish colonization of the Americas
 California mission clash of cultures
 Indian Reductions
 California Genocide
 Native Americans in the United States

Notes

References

Sources

Further reading

Books 

 
 
 
 

 Crespí, Juan: A Description of Distant Roads: Original Journals of the First Expedition into California, 1796–1770, edited and translated by Alan K. Brown, San Diego State University Press, 2001,

Articles and archives 
 Early California Population Project (ECPP) The Huntington Library, 2006. Provides public access to all the information contained in California's historic mission registers.
 California Missions article at the Catholic Encyclopedia
 The California Missions, 2001.
 Matrimonial Investigation records of the San Gabriel Mission Claremont Colleges Digital Library, 2008, 169 records digitized and searchable by priest name or by the names of the couple requesting marriage.
 Junipero Serra, the Vatican, & Enslavement Theology Preview of Fogel, Daniel. ISM Press Books. Offers a critical perspective on the missions' impact on California's Indians.
 MissionTour Tom Simondi, 2001–2005.
 The Old Franciscan Missions of California James, George Wharton, 1913. eText at Project Gutenberg.
 The San Diego Founders Trail 2001–2008 website.
 Trails and Roads: El Camino Real Faigin, Daniel P. California Highways, 1996–2004
 Almanac: California Missions GAzis-SAx, Joel, 1999.

External links 

 The California Frontier Project: Dedicated the early California, including the Spanish missions
California Mission Studies Association
 California's Spanish Missions
 The California Missions Trail, California Department of Parks and Recreation 
 Library of Congress: American Memory Project: Early California History, The Missions
 Tricia Anne Weber: The Spanish Missions of California
 Album of Views of the Missions of California, Souvenir Publishing Company, San Francisco, Los Angeles, 1890s.
 The Missions of California, by Eugene Leslie Smyth, Chicago: Alexander Belford & Co., 1899.
 California Historical Society
 California Mission Visitors Guide
California Missions: A Journey Along the El Camino Real (exhibit at The California Museum)
 National Register of Historic Places: Early History of the California Coast: List of Sites
 California Mission Sketches by Henry Miller, 1856 and Finding Aid to the Documents relating to Missions of the Californias : typescript, 1768–1802 at The Bancroft Library
 

 
The Californias
California Mission Indians
Archaeological sites in California
History of Catholicism in the United States
Native American history of California
California genocide
Junípero Serra